The 2010 Tour of Chongming Island Stage race was the fourth women's edition of the Tour of Chongming Island cycling stage race. It was rated by the UCI as category 2.1, and was held between 5 and 7 May 2010, in China.

Stages

Stage 1
5 May – Chongbai to Chongbai,

Stage 2
6 May –

Stage 3
7 May – Chongming to Chongming,

Final classifications

General classification

Source

See also
 2010 in women's road cycling

References

External links
Tour of Chongming Island website

Tour of Chongming Island
Tour of Chongming Island
2010 in Chinese sport